Panellus pusillus is a species of fungus in the family Mycenaceae. A widely distributed species, it has been recorded in Australia, Asia, Europe, North America, and South America.

References

External links

Mycenaceae
Fungi of Asia
Fungi of Australia
Fungi of Europe
Fungi of North America
Fungi of South America
Fungi described in 1844
Taxa named by Joseph-Henri Léveillé